In mathematics, the axiom of finite choice is a weak version of the axiom of choice which asserts that if  is a family of non-empty finite sets, then
 (set-theoretic product).
If every set can be linearly ordered, the axiom of finite choice follows.

Applications 
,
then  for at most countably many .

References 

Axioms of set theory
Axiom of choice